Ngaloi is a village in Churachandpur district, in the Indian state of Manipur. It was founded in 1950 by (L)Jangkhohen Haokip. The village is about 9 km from Churachandpur town. Ngaloi Falls is located near the village.

Village name
Ngaloi was formally known as Ngaloimoul.

References

Villages in Churachandpur district